Aung Myo Thant (born 1 December 1984) is a footballer from Myanmar. He made his first appearance for the Myanmar national football team in 2006.

International
In 2007, He represent the Myanmar U-23 to The Final of 2007 SEA Games. But Crused by Thailad U-23. 
 so Myanmar only get Silver Medal.

References 

1984 births
Living people
Burmese footballers
Myanmar international footballers
Association football midfielders
Southeast Asian Games silver medalists for Myanmar
Southeast Asian Games medalists in football
Competitors at the 2007 Southeast Asian Games